Adrian Settre was an Australian rules footballer for the Port Adelaide Football Club in the South Australian National Football League. Settre played a key part in Port Adelaide's 15 point win over Glenelg in the 1990 SANFL Grand Final  kicking three crucial and spectacular goals.

References

Port Adelaide Football Club (SANFL) players
Port Adelaide Football Club players (all competitions)